Jerrilynn Patton (born July 30, 1987), known as Jlin, is an electronic musician. She began producing music in 2008 and received early attention for her 2011 track "Erotic Heat". Jlin's debut album, Dark Energy, was released in 2015 to critical praise. Her follow-up Black Origami (2017) received further acclaim.

Biography 
Patton was raised in Gary, Indiana. Growing up, she was exposed to music through her parents, and her favorite artists were Anita Baker, Rachelle Ferrell, and Sade. She also heard footwork at an early age. She briefly attended Purdue University as a math major. As an adult, she supported herself by working at a steel mill, although she claims this did not substantively influence her work. Patton began making her own music in 2008, and was inspired by her mother to pursue a unique sound. She also received encouragement from figures such as DJ Rashad, who she communicated with online.

After making the track "Erotic Heat", she was hesitant to release it because it did not fit the conventional sound of a footwork song. The track was ultimately released on Planet Mu's Bangs & Works, Vol. 2 compilation in 2011, which showcased Chicago juke and footwork artists and brought Jlin attention. The song was later used to accompany a 2014 Rick Owens fashion show. She released her debut album Dark Energy in 2015 to critical acclaim. Dark Energy would help to popularize footwork on a global stage.

In 2017, Jlin released her second album Black Origami. It features collaborations with William Basinski, Holly Herndon, Fawkes, and Dope Saint Jude. It received universal acclaim and was named among the best albums of the year by various publications.

Also in 2017, Jlin was commissioned to compose the score for "AutoBIOgraphy", a new work by Company Wayne McGregor that has its premiere at Sadler's Wells in London in October 2017.  In 2020, Jlin created the new work "Perspectives", commissioned by the Boulanger Initiative for performance by Third Coast Percussion. In 2022, Jlin launched a course with online music school Soundfly, "Jlin: Rhythm, Variation, & Vulnerability."

Discography

Albums 
Dark Energy (2015, Planet Mu)
Black Origami (2017, Planet Mu)
Autobiography (Music from Wayne McGregor's Autobiography) (2018, Planet Mu)

Extended plays 
Free Fall (2015, Planet Mu)
Dark Lotus (2017, Planet Mu)
Embryo (2021, Planet Mu)

References

External links 
Jlin on Bandcamp
Jlin on SoundCloud
Jlin discography at Discogs

American electronic musicians
American women in electronic music
Musicians from Gary, Indiana
1987 births
Living people
21st-century American women musicians
Planet Mu artists
African-American women musicians
21st-century African-American women
21st-century African-American musicians
20th-century African-American people
20th-century African-American women